The seventh electoral unit of Republika Srpska is a parliamentary constituency used to elect members to the National Assembly of Republika Srpska since 2014.  It consists of the Municipalities of Osmaci, 
Zvornik,
Šekovići,
Vlasenica,
Bratunac,
Srebrenica and
Milići.

Demographics

Representatives

References

Constituencies of Bosnia and Herzegovina